is a Japanese manga series written and illustrated by Kaiji Kawaguchi with cooperation by journalist Osamu Eya. It was serialized in Shogakukan's seinen manga magazine Big Comic from December 2014 to December 2019. A sequel, titled Kūbo Ibuki Great Game, began in the same magazine in December 2019. A live-action film adaptation premiered in Japan in May 2019.

In 2018, the manga won the 63rd Shogakukan Manga Award in the General category. As of October 2022, the Kūbo Ibuki manga had over 8 million copies in circulation.

Plot
In October 20XX, an agent, who is believed to have disguised himself as a shipwrecked person during a storm, landed on Minamikojima Island in the Senkaku Islands, saying, This island is an inherent territory of China, and we are trying to avoid ships from mainland China. The Chinese Landing Incident on the Senkaku Islands, which claims to wait, has occurred. Furthermore, the situation escalated with a collision between a Chinese Coast Guard vessel attempting to invade Japan's territorial waters and a Japan Coast Guard patrol vessel, and warning shots being fired at an escort vessel dispatched for investigation purposes, and the Japanese government half-yielded to China. Although he tried to settle the situation, the Prime Minister felt a sense of crisis about China's actions, and at the same time decided to bring forward the "Pegasus Plan", which consists of commissioning a new type of escort ship and establishing a new escort group with that ship as the flagship. do. One year after the incident, the SDF's first aircraft carrier, Ibuki was completed. Captain Ryuta Akitsu, who has an unusual career as a former Air Self-Defense Force ace pilot, is appointed as the captain, and Toshiya Shinba is selected as the deputy commander and chief navigator.

In April 20XY, while the IBUKI was on a training voyage off the coast of Minamitorishima, the Chinese military launched the "Shuguang Project" and suddenly began to invade Japan. The Chinese army took control of the Sakishima Islands and the Senkaku Islands, causing the first deaths in the postwar period. Under the command of Keiichiro Tarumi, the first defense dispatch in history was ordered. Began to fear that a war might break out in my country. The Ibuki fleet, which was in training, rushes to the scene, but the Chinese military also sent the North Sea fleet, centered on the new aircraft carrier "Guangdong", to the Sakishima Islands. Negotiations with the Chinese government, which had begun to move, broke down, and finally the territorial recapture operation "Hayabusa" was launched by force.

Media

Manga
Kūbo Ibuki is written and illustrated by Kaiji Kawaguchi with cooperation by journalist Osamu Eya. The series was serialized in Shogakukan's seinen manga magazine Big Comic from December 10, 2014 to December 10, 2019.<ref></p></ref><ref></p></ref> Shogakukan has collected its chapters into thirteen tankōbon volumes, released from September 30, 2015 to June 30, 2020.

A direct sequel, titled , began in Big Comic on December 25, 2019. Shogakukan has collected its chapters into individual tankōbon volumes. The first volume was released on June 30, 2020. As of September 30, 2022, eight  volumes have been released.

Volume list

Kūbo Ibuki

Kūbo Ibuki Great Game

Live-action film
A live-action film adaptation of the manga was released in Japan on May 24, 2019. The film stars Hidetoshi Nishijima as Ryōta Akitsu and Kuranosuke Sasaki as Toshiya Niinami. The film is directed by Setsurō Wakamatsu, with scripts by Kazunori Itō and Yasuo Hasegawa and planning by Harutoshi Fukui.

Reception
As of December 2018, the Kūbo Ibuki manga had over 4 million copies in circulation. As of October 2022, the manga had over 8 million copies in circulation.

In 2018, alongside After the Rain, Kūbo Ibuki won the 63rd Shogakukan Manga Award in the General category. The manga ranked 18th on the 2019 "Book of the Year" list by Da Vinci magazine.

As of June 2019, the Kūbo Ibuki live-action film grossed ¥931,625,500 ($8.58 million). The film opened at #2 at the Japanese box office and earned ¥332,068,500 ($3.07 million) over its first three days. The film dropped to #3 in its second weekend, and earned ¥148,651,000 ($1.37 million) over the second weekend. The film dropped to #4 in its third weekend, and earned ¥82,234,500 ($757,900) from June 7–9, 2019.

References

External links
 
 
 

Military anime and manga
Seinen manga
Shogakukan manga
Winners of the Shogakukan Manga Award for general manga
Japanese war drama films